The Diocese of Makhachkala is a diocese of the Russian Orthodox Church on the territory of Dagestan, Ingushetia and Chechnya with its seat in the city of Makhachkala, the capital of the Republic of Dagestan, Russia. The main temple is the Cathedral of the Assumption.

History

On 28 December 1998, the territory of Dagestan became part of the Diocese of Baku.

On 26 December 2012, the Holy Synod formed the independent Makhachkala diocese, separated from the Vladikavkaz diocese, with its seat in Makhachkala and with the inclusion of parishes and monasteries in Dagestan, Ingushetia and Chechnya. 

On 5 October 2015, Bishop  of Makhachkala and Grozny led a religious procession in the city of Kizlyar, which became the first in Dagestan in recent history. The procession, timed to coincide with the celebration of the 1000th anniversary of the repose of Equal-to-the-Apostles Prince Vladimir and the 280th anniversary of the founding of the city, brought together about 1,000 Orthodox believers who walked a total of about three kilometers.

Statistics
Statistics at the end of 2014:
 Ministries - 24
 Diaconates - 4 
 Deanery districts  - 4
 Churches - 29
 Chapels - 15
 Prayer rooms - 3
 House churches – 1 
 Monastery - 2

Temples and monasteries
The Makhachkala deanery unites churches on the territory of Dagestan, with the exception of the three northern regions. The borders of the deanery coincide with the borders of the Republic of Dagestan, except for the northern one, which runs along the Terek River.

 Cathedral of the Assumption, Makhachkala
 Church of the Holy Equal-to-the-Apostles Prince Vladimir, Makhachkala
 Church of the Intercession of the Holy Virgin, Derbent

Notes

See also
 The Holy Synod within Dagestan formed the Makhachkala diocese within Dagestan, Ingushetia and the Chechen Republic

Eparchies of the Russian Orthodox Church
2012 establishments in Russia
Eastern Orthodox Church bodies in Asia
Eastern Orthodox Church bodies in Europe
Religion in Dagestan
Christian organizations established in 2012